Eloise Laws (born November 6, 1943) is an American singer and a member of the prominent Laws family of musicians from Houston, Texas.

Biography
Lavern Eloise Laws was born in Houston, Texas, as the fourth of eight children of Miola Luverta Donahue and Hubert Laws, Sr. Born into a family of musicians, her siblings include flutist Hubert, saxophonist Ronnie, and vocalist Debra.

In the 1970s, she began recording for Holland-Dozier-Holland's Music Merchant and later Invictus labels.  Her first album, Ain't It Good Feeling Good, was released on Invictus in 1977.  Unfortunately, the labels folded and Laws released the LP Eloise (ABC) later the same year and Eloise Laws (Liberty) in 1980, both of which featured the songwriting and producing talents of Linda Creed.

Eloise has been credited as one of the backing singers on her brother Ronnie's 1980 LP Every Generation.

After All in Time, for Capitol, followed two years later, Laws was featured on albums from such artists as Harvey Mason, Lee Oskar, Aquarian Dream, Ahmad Jamal, as well as several releases by her siblings. She would not record another solo album until the late 1990s.  Meanwhile, she pursued a career on stage, starring in the Tony-nominated musical, It Ain't Nothin' But the Blues, which she also co-wrote.

Discography

Studio albums
 1977: Ain't It Good Feeling Good (Invictus Records)
 1977: Eloise (ABC)
 1980: Eloise Laws (Liberty)
 1982: All in Time (Capitol)
 2000: The Key (Scepterstein)
 2003: Secrets (Scepterstein)

Compilations 
 1999: Love Factory: The Invictus Sessions (Castle)

References

American musical theatre actresses
1943 births
Living people
Musicians from Houston
Actresses from Houston
20th-century American actresses
20th-century American singers
21st-century American singers
20th-century American women singers
21st-century American women singers